Joseph Leslie Broadbent (June 3, 1891 – March 16, 1935) was a religious leader in the early stages of the Mormon fundamentalist movement.

Broadbent was born to Amanda Hermandine Twede and Joseph Samuel Broadbent, who served as mayor of Lehi, Utah, from 1922 to 1928.

In 1910, Broadbent left his studies at Brigham Young University to serve a mission in England for the Church of Jesus Christ of Latter-day Saints (LDS Church). In June 1915, he married Rula Louise Kelsch, and through his association with her family came to know John Wickersham Woolley. Among his other wives were Fawnetta Jessop, who married him in October 1925, and Irene Locket and Anna Kmetzsch, who had married him by 1933.

In 1927, Broadbent published the pamphlet "Celestial Marriage", which advocated the practice of plural marriage. This was one of the first Mormon fundamentalist tracts and was a factor in his subsequent excommunication by the LDS Church in July 1929. Broadbent was ordained an apostle in the Mormon fundamentalist organization called the Council of Friends by Lorin Calvin Woolley on March 6, 1929, and on May 15 was given the title of "second elder" by Woolley.

Upon Woolley's death in 1934, Broadbent succeeded him as priesthood president. Among Mormon fundamentalists, the succession was largely uncontroversial, and Broadbent traveled widely in support of the fundamentalist movement. In February 1935, he and a number of other fundamentalist leaders visited Millville, Utah, for a meeting with co-religionists. The next month, Broadbent died from pneumonia.

According to his friend Louis Kelsch, on the day of his death Broadbent said that he had not experienced any personal vision of heavenly messengers. However, Broadbent also commented, "If they come to get me, I can tell them that I am still in the work," as he pointed to religious books he planned to mail.

References

External links
Mormonfundamentalism.com biography of Joseph Leslie Broadbent

1891 births
1935 deaths
20th-century Mormon missionaries
American Latter Day Saint leaders
American Mormon missionaries in England
Brigham Young University alumni
Mormon fundamentalist leaders
People excommunicated by the Church of Jesus Christ of Latter-day Saints
People from Lehi, Utah
Religious leaders from Utah